Erimo may refer to:
 Cape Erimo, headland in Hokkaido
 Erimo, Hokkaido, town in Hokkaido
 JDS Erimo, a former minelayer of the JMSDF commissioned in 1955